The Furchester Hotel is a puppet series that aired on CBeebies (the BBC's preschool network). It was the second British-American spin-off of Sesame Street that the BBC had made after Sesame Tree 6 years before. The show ran on CBeebies on 26 September 2014. The show aired in 2016 on Sprout (now Universal Kids) until March 2nd 2019.

Plot
The Furchester Hotel is a half-star hotel in England that is owned by a monster family called the Furchester-Fuzz Family. The Furchester-Fuzz Family alongside Elmo and Cookie Monster figure out how to solve different issues that are developed by the guests of the Furchester Hotel.

Characters

Main characters
 Funella Furchester (performed by Louise Gold) – A monster who is the wife of Furgus, the mother of Phoebe, and the aunt of Elmo. Funella is the main proprietor of the Furchester Hotel, welcoming guests and making sure their stay is wonderful in any way she can. She was designed by Ed Christie.
 Furgus Fuzz (performed by Andrew Spooner) – A monster who is the husband of Funella, the father of Phoebe, and the uncle of Elmo. He serves as the jack-of-all-trades at the Furchester Hotel and specializes in the hotel's repair needs. Similar to Grover, Furgus takes on several other jobs around the hotel as needed. He was designed by Ed Christie.
 Phoebe Furchester-Fuzz (performed by Sarah Burgess) – The protagonist of the series. A seven-year-old violet monster who is the daughter of Furgus and Funella and the cousin of Elmo. Phoebe's main duty at the Furchester Hotel is answering the phone. When she gets a monster idea, her pigtail stands on end and she often says "Fuzzawubba!". In "Animal Talk," it is revealed that Phoebe knows many animal languages. In "Phoebe's Key," it is revealed that the key on Phoebe's necklace can unlock all the doors in the Furchester Hotel as well as the hotel safe. She was designed by Ed Christie.
 Elmo (performed by Ryan Dillon) – Elmo is the cousin of Phoebe and the nephew of Furgus and Funella. He took an extended stay at the Furchester Hotel due to his fascination with it. Elmo's father Louie is the brother of Funella.
 Cookie Monster (performed by David Rudman) – Cookie Monster works as the room service worker and a waiter in the Furchester Hotel's dining room. As usual, he eats any cookies that come in his sight. In "Cookie Confusion", it is revealed that Cookie Monster has a British cousin named Biscuit Monster who eats biscuits.
 Note: Abby Cadabby was originally going to be cast as one of the main cast in the series, but was cut off just before the main production due to budget reasons.

Recurring characters
 Isabel – A pink furry bell-shaped monster that resembles a call bell. Similar to the Dingers (to whom she is related), Isabel can only communicate through a series of rings. She notifies Funella Furchester whenever an incoming guest is arriving and has a general knowledge of what's happening in the hotel at all times, as well as also cuing the musical breaks during the episodes. Isabel's puppeteers alternate between Sheila Clark and Lesa Gillespie. She was designed by Ed Christie.
 Harvey P. Dull (performed by Mak Wilson in Season One, Neil Sterenberg in Season Two) – A Fat Blue Anything Muppet who is a long-term occupant of the Furchester Hotel. In a similar fashion to Mr. Johnson, Harvey P. Dull frequently bears the brunt of the poor service. He cites the one positive thing about the Furchester Hotel is his favorite comfy chair. Harvey claims that the only reason he resides at the Furchester Hotel is a lack of availability in any other nearby hotels. It is currently unknown why he lives in the furchester hotel.
 Gonger (performed by Mak Wilson in most episodes, David Rudman in some episodes, Colin Purves in "Very Important Porcupine," Warrick Brownlow-Pike in Season Two) – A small furry pink monster who initially serves as a minor character in the first season. Gonger would bang the large gong at Monster Tea Time, with the large gong occasionally knocking Gonger down or causing him to have a vibration reaction. Sometimes after he bangs the gong, Gonger shouts "Tea Time" to alert the Tea Time Monsters when it's Monster Tea Time. In Season Two, Gonger has a major role and now works as a hotel chef and still bangs the gong for Monster Tea Time from the kitchen. Gonger was later imported to the main show Sesame Street and joined the cast as part of the season 48 segment "Cookie Monster's Foodie Truck."
 The Tea Time Monsters – The Tea Time Monsters are a quintet of colorful monsters that appear whenever Monster Tea Time occurs (signified by Gonger banging a gong). When Gonger bangs the gong, the Tea Time Monsters emerge from their rooms and plow their way through the Furchester Hotel to get to their tea. During the credits of each episode, the Monsters are shown enjoying Monster Tea Time while chanting "Ugga wugga tea time, ugga wugga clink. Ugga wugga tea time, ugga wugga drink!"
 Colonel Mustard (alternatively performed by Warrick Brownlow-Pike and Andy Heath) – A yellow monster who is a member of the Tea Time Monsters.
 Sorbet (performed by David Rudman and Mak Wilson) – An orange monster who is a member of the Tea Time Monsters. He is a recycled version of the Live-Hand variant of Narf from Sesame Street that was previously used for Yoyo on 5, Rue Sésame.
 Ethel Bay-Mertz (performed by Lesa Gillespie) – A female purple monster who is a member of the Tea Time Monsters.
 Berry (performed by Toby Wilson) – A blue monster who is a member of the Tea Time Monsters. He resembles a modified version of Herry Monster.
 Lulu Lemon (performed by Warrick Brownlow-Pike) – A green female monster who is a member of the Tea Time Monsters.

Guest characters
 Big Bird (performed by Matt Vogel) – Big Bird is a special guest at the Furchester Hotel. In "A Big Bird Surprise", Elmo and his friends welcome Big Bird to the Furchester Hotel where he meets everyone. In "A Furchester Christmas", Big Bird and his friends are waiting for Santa where he gives everyone special gifts.
 Count von Count (performed by Matt Vogel) - The Count is a special guest at the Furchester Hotel. In "The Count's Vacation", Elmo and his friends meet Count von Count and The Countess to have a break for counting. In "A Furchester Christmas", The Count and his friends are waiting for Santa where he gives everyone special gifts.
 British Two-Headed Monster - A British counterpart of the Two-Headed Monster which sports different facial features and no horns. He makes different background appearances like during the song "A Furchester Never Gives Up" and partaking in the "Monster Monster Day" song where he was seen with Gonger and the Tea Time Monsters.

Production 
The series is a British-American co-production. It promotes problem-solving as the monsters try to figure out issues developed by their unique guests. Production of fifty-two 11-minute episodes (for two seasons) began on February 24, 2014 at dock10 studios, MediaCityUK takes about 3 months and ended on May 18, 2014.

On 14 November 2014 Sesame Street's YouTube channel began airing full episodes of The Furchester Hotel each week.

In February 2016, The Furchester Hotel was renewed for Season 2 which began production on May 16, 2016 and ended on August 19, 2016. It consists of 50 episodes and a double-length Christmas episode as well as guest appearances by Big Bird, Count von Count, and the Yip Yips. The second season began on 31 October 2016.

On 26 September 2016, Sprout started airing The Furchester Hotel on weekdays. Reruns were aired until 2 March 2019.

On 23 December 2017, The Furchester Hotel started airing in Canada on CBC Kids.

Opening sequence
The show opens with a different character's face shaped as the river and zooms down into where the hotel is and all the Furchester Family can be seen singing where they are joined in by Elmo and Cookie Monster. At the end, all the guests are singing with the Furchester Family, Cookie Monster, and the Tea Time Monsters.

Episodes

Series 1 (2014–16)

Series 2 (2016–17)

Broadcast
In Australia, the show was airing on 13 April 2015 at 7:30 am on ABC Kids. In South Africa, Poland and Australia, the show was airing on CBeebies. In the UK, Canada, Spain, France, Belgium, the Netherlands, Hong Kong and Singapore, the show is on Netflix. In Canada, the show is on CBC Kids on 23 December 2017. In Ireland, the show was dubbed into Irish language called "Óstán Furchester" on Cúla 4 on 6 June 2018. In Mexico, the show premiered on Azteca 7 on June 20, 2022 as “Plaza Sésamo: El Hotel Furchester”.In Asia, the show aired on Disney Junior Southeast Asia.

References

External links
 
 The Furchester Hotel at Internet Movie Database
 The Furchester Hotel at Muppet Wiki

2014 American television series debuts
2017 American television series endings
2010s American children's television series
2014 British television series debuts
2017 British television series endings
2010s British children's television series
American preschool education television series
American television shows featuring puppetry
British preschool education television series
British television shows featuring puppetry
Sesame Street international co-productions
Fictional hotels
Sesame Street
BBC children's television shows
Nick Jr. original programming
English-language television shows
Television series about families
Television series about monsters
Television series by BBC Studios
Television series by Sesame Workshop
CBeebies
2010s preschool education television series